Batocera rosenbergi is a species of beetle in the family Cerambycidae. It was described by Kaup in 1866. It is known from Indonesia.

References

Batocerini
Beetles described in 1866